This is a complete list of Cincinnati Bengals head coaches. There have been ten head coaches for the Cincinnati Bengals of the National Football League (NFL). A professional American football team based in Cincinnati, Ohio, the Bengals are a member of the North Division of the American Football Conference (AFC). The Bengals franchise was founded in 1968 as a member of the Western Division of the American Football League (AFL), before merging with the NFL in 1970.

The current head coach is Zac Taylor, who was hired after the 2018 season. Taylor replaced Marvin Lewis, who remains the Bengals all-time leader in seasons coached, games coached, wins, and playoff games coached. Three coaches have won a conference championship with the team: Forrest Gregg in 1981, Sam Wyche in 1988 and Taylor in 2021. Gregg leads all coaches in winning percentage with .561. Dick LeBeau had the lowest winning percentage, with .267. Of the nine Bengals head coaches, three have been elected to the Pro Football Hall of Fame: Paul Brown, Forrest Gregg, and Dick LeBeau (although only Brown was inducted as a coach, the other two were inducted as players). Two former players have been head coach for the Bengals: Sam Wyche and Bruce Coslet.

Key

Coaches
Note: Statistics are accurate through the end of the 2021 NFL season.

Notes

References

General
 
 

Specific

 
Cincinnati Bengals
Head coaches